Trevor Denbow (born August 26, 1998) is an American football safety for the Indianapolis Colts of the National Football League (NFL).

Early life and education
Denbow was born on August 26, 1998, in Corsicana, Texas. He attended Corsicana High School and was named All-American by USA Today as a senior. He also earned District 17-5A Player of the Year honors. For his freshman year of college, Denbow attended Navarro and appeared in 10 games, recording 36 tackles and four interceptions.

Denbow accepted a scholarship offer from Southern Methodist University (SMU) in December 2017, and enrolled in January 2018. As a sophomore in 2018, he appeared in a total of 12 games, eight of which he played as a starter in. Denbow finished the season with 41 tackles, a half-sack, and 3.5 . In 2019, Denbow was selected third-team preseason all-conference by Phil Steele, and ended up starting all 13 games. He made 64 total tackles, a half-sack and one forced fumble. He also served as the team's punter, averaging 38.7 yards per attempt with a long of 72 yards that year.

In a COVID-19-shortened 2020 season, the senior Denbow started all 10 games and tallied 27 tackles, 7.0 TFLs and one sack, while also returning one interception for 11 yards. After being given an extra year of eligibility due to the pandemic, Denbow opted to return in 2021 for a super senior season. He finished the year having appeared in all 12 games, all but one as a starter, and recorded 40 total tackles as well as two interceptions.

Professional career

After going unselected in the 2022 NFL Draft, Denbow was signed by the Indianapolis Colts as an undrafted free agent, being given a contract that included $10,000 guaranteed and a $15,000 signing bonus. He survived roster cuts and was named to the final roster in August, but was shortly afterwards placed on injured reserve. He was designated for return on October 26 and was activated five days later. Denbow made his NFL debut in the Colts' week nine loss to the New England Patriots, appearing on 16 special teams snaps. He was waived on November 22, and re-signed to the practice squad. He signed a reserve/future contract on January 9, 2023.

Personal life
Denbow is the grandson of Don Denbow, who served as mayor of Corsicana, was a star football player at SMU, and was a first-round draft choice of the Los Angeles Dodgers. He is the son-in-law of Monica Aldama, head cheer coach at Navarro College and star of the Netflix docuseries Cheer.

References

1998 births
Living people
American football safeties
American football punters
American football linebackers
Players of American football from Texas
People from Corsicana, Texas
Navarro Bulldogs football players
SMU Mustangs football players
Indianapolis Colts players